Mahesh Kale (Marathi: महेश काळे; born 12 January 1976) is an Indian Classical vocalist renowned for his specialization in Indian Classical (Hindustani), Semi-Classical, Devotional music including Natya Sangeet. Mahesh Kale won the 63rd National Film Award as the Best Playback Singer, for classical piece in the film Katyar Kaljat Ghusli. He is a disciple of Pandit Jitendra Abhisheki. He was ranked nineteenth in The Times of India's Top 20 Most Desirable Men of Maharashtra in 2017.

Early life and background 

Mahesh was born and raised in a musical family in Pune, Maharashtra, India. He began his early music education under the guidance of his mother Smt. Meenal Kale. She had a Masters Degree in Indian Classical Music and was a disciple of Veena Sahasrabuddhe. 

Mahesh gave his first solo performance at the age of 3 at Gondavale, with the rendition of a devotional song he mesmerized an audience of over 5000. At the age of 6, he started learning music formally from his mother Smt. Meenal Kale. Later he learned from Shri Purushottam Gangurde. Despite his young age, Mahesh was chosen as the disciple of legendary Pandit Jitendra Abhisheki in 1991. Under his tutelage in a gurukul-like setting, Mahesh was extensively trained in classical and semi-classical forms like thumri, dadra, tappa, bhajans, and marathi natya sangeet for over 8 years. During that time, he accompanied his guru Pt. Jitendra Abhisheki as a vocal support in concerts all across India and also received vocal guidance from Shri Shounak Abhisheki (son of Pt. Jitendra Abhisheki).

Mahesh holds a Bachelors in Electronics Engineering from Vishwakarma Institute of Technology affiliated to Savitribai Phule Pune University (India) and a master's degree in Engineering Management from Santa Clara University (United States). Mahesh is married to Purva Gujar-Kale (m. 2005) and they run non-profit Indian Classical Music and Arts Foundation together in San Francisco Bay Area.

Career 

Mahesh has performed in hundreds of concerts of Indian Classical and Semi-Classical Vocal in India, US, UAE, UK, Australia, Europe, and Southeast Asia.

Since early 2010, Mahesh has been playing the central character in Katyar Kaljat Ghusli, the evergreen Sangeet Natak (musical). The 100th show of Katyar Kaljat Ghusali  was performed in Vasantotsav 2016 at Pune recently. Mahesh debuted at the Sawai Gandharva Music Festival (Pune) in 2011 which received generous appreciation.

He has performed in Indian Classical as well as fusion concerts with world-famous percussionists like Ustad Zakir Hussain, Sivamani and Trilok Gurtu, and instrumentalists like Pedro Eustache and Frank Martin and in Jazz concerts with well known composer and saxophonist George Brooks and groove-master bassist Kai Eckhardt. Mahesh has also performed at non-traditional avenues like the NH7 Weekender, Pune (2018), 26/11 Stories of Strength tribute concert at the Gateway of India (2018, 2019).

He has given lecture-demonstrations in various US universities including Stanford and Harvard University and at institutions like Commonwealth Club and INKTalks.

Currently Mahesh is teaching music actively to over 100 students in the San Francisco Bay Area. He has also voiced the songs sung by the character of "Sadashiv" (portrayed by Subodh Bhave) in the movie Katyar Kaljat Ghusali which released on 12 November 2015 and received National Film Award for Best Playback Singer (Male) 2015.

Kale is a popular judge on TV show Sur Nava Dhyas Nava on Colors Marathi TV channel which scouts for singing talent in Maharashtra.

Awards 
 "National Film Award for Best Playback Singer (Male)" for the film Katyar Kaljat Ghusali at 63rd National Film Awards 2015
 "Majha Sanman Award" by ABP Majha 2016
 "Pride of India Award" WCRC 2016
 "Pravah Ratna" award by Star Pravah 2016
 "Sanskruti Kaladarpan Award" – Best Singer 2016
 "Manik Verma Puraskar" – 2016
 "Radio Mirchi Music Award" – Best Song 2016
 "Radio Mirchi Music Award" – Best Upcoming Vocalist (Male) 2016
 "Radio Mirchi Music Award" – Best Album Katyar Kaljat Ghusli 2016
 "Zee Cine Gaurav Puraskar" – Special Jury Award 2016
 Akhil Bharatiya Marathi Natya Parishad Award for his role in musical Katyar Kaljat Ghusali (2015)
 "ICC Inspire Award" of India Community Center San Francisco Bay Area (2019)

Discography 
 Prarambh, the beginning
 NatyaSaurabh
 Adhvan
 Introducing Mahesh Kale (by SaReGaMa Records)
 NatyaBhaktiRang (by SaReGaMa Records)
 Sukhache je sukh (by SaReGaMa Records)
 Dharti Ma - A Tribute to Earth (by Earth Day Network - India)
 We For Love  in collaboration with Amaan Ali Bangash and Ayaan Ali Bangash - Justice For Every Child campaign by Kailash Satyarthi Children’s Foundation (KSCF)

References 

 In Conversation With Mahesh Kale, Lokvani
 अमेरिकेत संगीत रूजविणारा मराठी तरूण कलावंत महेश काळे, Global Marathi
 Let passion be your driving force, Times of India
 Time-Trip Through Indian Classical Music, San Francisco Classical Voice
 Mahesh Kale with Singapore Events
 वसंतरावांच्या सुरील्या कट्यारीला नाविन्याची धार, Sakal
 Sawai Gandharva Music Festival featuring Mahesh Kale
 Song of the Divine, Stanford University
 Artist in Profile – Mahesh Kale, Harvard Sangeet
 Story of Indian Classical Music by Mahesh Kale at Commonwealth Club, San Francisco
 INKTalks featuring Mahesh Kale
 Amaan And Ayaan Ali Bangash's Latest Release Was For A Cause

External links 
 Official website

1976 births
Hindustani singers
Living people
Marathi-language singers
Singers from Pune
Best Male Playback Singer National Film Award winners